Romco Group is a UK-based non-ferrous metal recycler. Romco creates usable recycled non-ferrous metal ingots, reducing the need for raw material mining. Its largest facilities are located in Nigeria and Ghana.

Overview
Romco Group was founded in 2015 by Raymond Onovwigun. In 2015, the company began recycling and trading non-ferrous metals from Lagos, Nigeria. It has five aluminum furnaces and two copper induction furnaces. In February 2021, Romco Group opened its second non-ferrous recycling facility in Prampram, Ghana, consisting of two furnaces. As of January 2023, Romco Group is headquartered in London. It has two recycling facilities, one in Nigeria and the other in Ghana.

History
Soon after its foundation, Romco Group acquired land and a recycling plant in Lagos, Nigeria. In October 2015, the company made its first export of used beverage cans to South Korea.

Two years later, on September 1, 2017, Romco Group made its first 2000 metric tonnes shipment. A few years later, Romco installed five new furnaces at its Nigerian facility.

On February 12, 2021, Romco Metals was opened in Ghana after completing tests in January. On April 19, 2021, Romco was inducted into the United Nations Global Compact.

On June 18, 2021, Romco upgraded to a total of 7 furnaces across the group and, in October, installed CNG in a Nigerian facility to further reduce the carbon emission of operations.

Process overview
Romco sources scrap metal (often referred to as feedstock) from cast scrap traders, commercial waste, landfill collections, vehicles, scrapped industrial equipment, collected cans, remodeled homes, construction sites, and any other general waste facilities via intermediaries, metal merchants, and trade hubs all across the West African region. Romco then sorts this waste into categories for processing and smelts the suitable materials via furnaces into usable ingots that can be recycled back into the automotive, packaging, aeronautical, medical sectors, and more.

Currently, most of Romco's inbound materials are aluminum. However, other materials include copper, lead, and zinc.

See also
Aluminium recycling

References

The perfect storm increasing the cost of a crucial metal. BBC News.

External links	
Official website

Waste management companies of the United Kingdom